Desiderio Alberto Arnaz IV (born January 19, 1953), known professionally as Desi Arnaz Jr., is a retired American actor and musician. He is the son of Lucille Ball and Desi Arnaz.

Early life
Arnaz was born on January 19, 1953, at Cedars-Sinai Medical Center in Los Angeles, California. His older sister is actress Lucie Arnaz, who was born in 1951.

His birth was one of the most publicized in television history. His parents were the stars of the television sitcom I Love Lucy, and Ball's pregnancy was part of the story line, which was considered daring in 1952. The same day Ball gave birth to Desi Jr., the fictional Lucy Ricardo gave birth to "Little Ricky." As a testament to how interested the American public was in Lucy's TV baby, Arnaz appeared on the cover of the very first issue of TV Guide with the headline "Lucy's $50,000,000 baby," ($ in  dollars) because revenue from advertising tie-ins was expected to top that mark. Actor Richard Keith (a.k.a. Keith Thibodeaux) later portrayed "Little Ricky" in the TV series; Keith spent much time with Lucie and Desi Jr. in childhood and became close friends with the family, teaching Desi Jr. how to play drums.

Arnaz attended University High School in West Los Angeles.

Career

At age 12, Arnaz was a drummer with Dino, Desi, & Billy. The others were Dean Paul Martin (son of Dean Martin) and Billy Hinsche. The band scored two hit singles with "I'm a Fool" and "Not the Lovin' Kind" in 1965.

Acting
From 1968 to 1974, Desi Arnaz and his sister Lucie co-starred opposite their mother in Here's Lucy as her children. In 1968, he had a guest-starring role as Jerry and Suzie's drum-playing friend Tommy in the episode, "The Hombre Who Came to Dinner: Part 2," from the show The Mothers-in-Law, executive-produced and directed by his father. In 1970, he appeared on The Brady Bunch episode "The Possible Dream."  His best chance at enduring Hollywood fame came in 1973, when he played the title role in the film Marco, a musical about the life of adventurer Marco Polo.  However, like most Hollywood musicals of that period, it failed to register at the box office.

In 1974, Arnaz played the title role in the Western movie Billy Two Hats with Gregory Peck. In 1976, he appeared on two episodes of the television series, The Streets of San Francisco. Arnaz also appeared in a 1976 episode of Saturday Night Live (SNL) hosted by both Desi Arnaz and Desi Arnaz Jr.. The younger Arnaz played Ricky Ricardo while Gilda Radner played Lucy in spoofs of supposed ill-fated pilots for I Love Lucy.

In 1977, he was the lead in the film Joyride opposite fellow children of famous actors Melanie Griffith, Robert Carradine, and Anne Lockhart.

Arnaz's acting extended into the late 1980s with various appearances on television, and a leading role in the series Automan, which ran from 1983 to 1984.

In 1992, he played his father in the movie The Mambo Kings, based on a Pulitzer Prize-winning novel that he felt treated his father with respect. The film includes a scene in which Desi Jr., playing his father's character Ricky Ricardo, acts opposite his mother as Lucy Ricardo with film from the TV series intercut with the cast.

Later
Between 1998 and 2010, he was touring with a new configuration of Dino, Desi & Billy called Ricci, Desi & Billy, featuring Arnaz reunited with Billy Hinsche, and joined by Ricci Martin (youngest son of Dean Martin). The group performed original material as well as the songs the original band performed.

From about 2002 to 2007, he was vice-president of the board of Directors of the Lucille Ball–Desi Arnaz Center in Jamestown, New York. He resigned over a dispute with the executive director over the center.

In 2007, Arnaz appeared at the 5th Annual TV Land Awards with his sister Lucie to accept the Legacy of Laughter award posthumously given to their mother.

Arnaz has also headlined Babalu: A Celebration of the Music of Desi Arnaz and his Orchestra with Lucie Arnaz, Raul Esparza, and Valarie Pettiford.

On October 15, 2011, Arnaz performed in Babalu at the Coolidge Auditorium of the Library of Congress. The performance was in conjunction with the Library's Lucille Ball and Desi Arnaz Collection.

Personal life
Arnaz has a daughter, Julia Arnaz, from a relationship with model Susan Callahan-Howe in 1968 when they were both 15 years old; Julia's relationship to Desi Jr. was proven by a paternity test in 1991.

Arnaz dated actress Patty Duke when he was 17 and she was 23. He accompanied Duke to the 1970 Emmy Awards ceremony where she won the Emmy for Outstanding Single Performance. The relationship became tabloid news and his mother did not approve of them together, and Duke became pregnant. After they broke up, writer and music producer Michael Tell offered to marry Duke as a way out of the scandal. Their marriage lasted only 13 days, and when Duke would later tell her son, Sean Astin, that Arnaz was his biological father, Arnaz and Astin developed a close relationship, although genetic tests later revealed that Tell was his father.  Astin said, "I can call any of them on the phone any time I want to ... John, Desi, Mike or Papa Mike ... my four dads." (Michael Pearce, Duke's husband after John Astin, was his step-father.)

Arnaz was subsequently involved with entertainer Liza Minnelli, another relationship of which his mother disapproved; Ball thought that the singer-actress was too old for her son and, because of Minnelli's perceived reckless lifestyle, not a good influence upon him. Arnaz accompanied Minnelli to the Academy Awards ceremony in March 1973 when she won the Academy Award for Best Actress.

Arnaz married actress Linda Purl in 1979. On January 3, 1980, Purl filed for divorce, which was finalized later that year.  On October 8, 1987, Arnaz married Amy Laura Bargiel. The couple lived in Boulder City, Nevada, with their daughter, Haley. In 1997, Arnaz purchased the Boulder Theatre in town and restored it, when it had been on the brink of ruin. After its conversion to a theatre, the cinema became the home of the Boulder City Ballet Company.

Desi's wife Amy died of cancer in 2015, at the age of 63. Both Desi and Amy were followers of Vernon Howard and attended meetings of Howard's New Life Foundation in Boulder City. They also followed and have supported the spiritual writer Guy Finley (also one of Vernon Howard's students) and his Life of Learning Center for Spiritual Discovery.

Arnaz's granddaughter (daughter of Julia) Desiree S. Anzalone, a photographer, died from breast cancer on September 27, 2020, at the age of 31. She was first diagnosed with cancer when she was 25.

Filmography

1957: I Love Lucy – Spectator at Unveiling (1 episode, 1957)
1962: The Lucy Show – Spectator (5 episodes, 1962–1965)
1968: Here's Lucy – Craig Carter (1968–1972)
1968: The Mothers-In-Law – Tommy (2 episodes, 1968)
1970: The Brady Bunch (as himself) ("The Possible Dream" episode)
1971: Love, American Style – Alan (segment "Love and the Motel Mixup") (1 episode, 1971)
1971: The Mod Squad – Victor Emory (1 episode, 1971)
1971: Mr. and Mrs. Bo Jo Jones (Made for TV movie) – Bo Jo Jones
1971: Night Gallery – Doran (1 episode, 1971)
1971: Red Sky at Morning – William 'Steenie' Stenopolous
1973: Marco  – Marco Polo
1973: She Lives! (TV) – Andy Reed
1973: Voyage of the Yes (TV) – Cal Markwell
1974: Billy Two Hats – Billy Two Hats
1975: Medical Story – Jerry Mitchell (1 episode, 1975)
1975: Medical Center (1 episode, 1975)
1976: The Streets of San Francisco – B. J. Palmer (1 episode, 1976)
1976: Police Story – Jay Vernon (2 episodes, 1976)
1976: Having Babies (TV) – Frank Gorman
1977: Black Market Baby (TV) – Steve Aletti
1977: Joyride – Scott
1977: Flight to Holocaust (TV) – Rick Bender
1978: How to Pick Up Girls! (TV) – Robby Harrington
1978: Fantasy Island – Barney Hunter (1 episode, 1978)
1978: A Wedding – Dino Sloan Corelli
1978: The Courage and the Passion (TV) – Sgt. Tom Wade
1978: To Kill a Cop (TV) – Martin Delahanty
1978: The Love Boat – Steve Hollis (2 episodes, 1978)
1979: Crisis in Mid-Air (TV) – Tim Donovan
1980: The Great American Traffic Jam (TV) – Robbie Reinhardt
1981: Advice to the Lovelorn (TV) – Steve Vernon
1982: Fake-Out – Detective Clint Morgan
1983: Automan – Walter Nebicher (13 episodes, 1983–1984)
1983: The Night the Bridge Fell Down (TV) – Johnny Pyle
1983: House of the Long Shadows – Kenneth Magee
1987: Paul Reiser Out on a Whim (TV)
1987: Matlock – Michael Porter (1 episode, 1987)
1992: The Mambo Kings – Desi Arnaz Sr.

References

External links

 
 

1953 births
Living people
American male television actors
American male child actors
Male actors from Los Angeles
New Star of the Year (Actor) Golden Globe winners
American entertainers of Cuban descent
American people of English descent
American people of French descent
American people of Irish descent
American people of Scottish descent
Desi
Hispanic and Latino American male actors
20th-century American male actors
20th-century American drummers
American male drummers
21st-century American drummers
20th-century American male musicians
21st-century American male musicians
American musicians of Cuban descent